Interactive Introverts was the second stage show and world tour by YouTubers Dan and Phil (Daniel Howell and Phil Lester) that took place in 2018 and the duo's latest major collaborative project to date. The tour ran from April, starting in Brighton, to September, ending in Mumbai, and included 80 shows in 18 countries, including but not limited to Poland, the Philippines, Russia, New Zealand, Finland, and the Netherlands, making it one of the biggest and most international YouTuber tours of all time.

Development
Howell and Lester planned in early 2017 to embark on a world tour with the intention of visiting parts of the world they had not been able to visit before, such as much of Europe, Asia, and South America. Unlike their first tour, the legs of which were spread out across 2015 and 2016, Howell and Lester made a point of completing this tour in one go with legs back to back, starting in May and ending in September 2018.

The tour was announced in November 2017 with a teaser on Howell's channel, followed by a trailer in June 2018 in addition to various promotional and behind the scenes content across their channels and social media. The premise for this tour was less theatrical than their first tour and more based on audience interaction, with the tagline "Giving the people what they want".

Film
Dan and Phil partnered with BBC Studios' TalentWorks to release a movie of Interactive Introverts with bonus features, such as behind the scenes content and director's commentary, on DVD, Blu-ray, and available for digital download in December 2018.

To make up for the Brazil date that had not worked out in the original schedule, Howell and Lester premiered their film at the Teatro Opus in São Paulo in November 2018 with a live Q&A session and a meet and greet. A Twitter-based watch party for the film took place in January 2019.

Tour dates

References

Dan and Phil
Comedy tours